LRI may refer to:

Leicester Royal Infirmary
Lift Reserve Indicator
Limbal relaxing incisions
Lincoln Red Imps F.C., a semi-professional football club from Gibraltar
Line-replaceable item, a modular component of an airplane, ship or spacecraft
London Research Institute, a biological research facility 
USCG Long Range Interceptor
Lower respiratory (tract) infection